Aloisio Emor Ojetuk was governor of Eastern Equatoria State of South Sudan from 2005 to 2010.

In September 2006, Ojetuk said that the remnants of the former Equatoria Defence Forces (EDF) were being supplied with ammunition by the Sudanese Armed Forces and were still a threat to security. Many had joined the Sudanese People's Liberation Army but some refused to make this move.
In January 2010, Ojetuk was seeking reelection in the April 2010 elections, while the SPLM state chairman Louis Lobong was also after the job.

Council of Chiefs
In June 2006 Ojetuk appointed a council of chiefs, as follows:

References

South Sudanese state governors
People from Eastern Equatoria
South Sudanese military personnel
Living people
Sudan People's Liberation Movement politicians
Year of birth missing (living people)